David Reeder (May 5, 1931 – August 1, 2005) was a British historian at the University of Leicester. After graduating from Nunthorpe Grammar School he won a scholarship at the University of Durham, where he served as Editor of Palatinate. He was a member of Hatfield College, where he was Captain of Table Tennis in 1950. Reeder took his PhD at the University of Leicester. He pursued a career in urban history and the history of education, co-founding the Urban History Group and editing the Urban History Yearbook for nine years.

Publications 
 The Victorian City: Images and Realities (1973)
 Urban Education In The Nineteenth Century (1977)
 Educating Our Masters (1980)

References 

1931 births
2005 deaths
Alumni of Hatfield College, Durham
Alumni of the University of Leicester
20th-century British historians